Trauma is a Canadian French language television medical drama series, which premiered January 5, 2010 – April 2, 2014 on Ici Radio-Canada Télé. The series is set in the trauma unit of the fictional Hôpital Saint-Arsène in Montreal, Quebec.

Cast
 Isabel Richer : Julie Lemieux
 Gilbert Sicotte : Antoine Légaré
 Jean-François Pichette : Mathieu Darveau
 James Hyndman : Pierre Meilleur
 Christian Bégin : David Roche
 Pascale Montpetit : Diane Hevey
 Stéphane Demers : Julien Léveillée
 Laurence Leboeuf : Sophie Léveillée
 Yan England : Étienne Labrie
 Catherine De Léan : Caroline Lemelin
 Maxime Le Flaguais : Éric Lanoue
 Isabelle Blais : Véronique Bilodeau
 Madeleine Péloquin : Martine Laliberté
 Cristina Rosato : Amaro Giulia
 Alice Morel-Michaud : Julie Lemieux (as child in flashbacks)

Music

For each season, all soundtrack music for the series has been provided by a noted pop singer from Quebec, who has recorded cover versions of famous pop and rock songs. Music was recorded by Ariane Moffatt in the first and second seasons, Pascale Picard Band in the third, Martha Wainwright in the fourth and Cœur de pirate in the fifth season.

References

External links

2010 Canadian television series debuts
2014 Canadian television series endings
2010s Canadian drama television series
2010s Canadian medical television series
Television shows set in Montreal
Ici Radio-Canada Télé original programming